Ghasipura is a census town and an administrative block in the Anandapur Subdivision of Kendujhar District, Odisha, India. It lies on the way from Bhubaneswar to Kendujhar at a distance of 160 km from the former and 80 km from the later. The whole block comprises 179 villages including the village Ghasipura.

Geography
The town lies on the right bank of the Baitarani River with geographic location . The town is bounded by the Baitarani River to its north, Salapada to its east, Sailong to its west and Kainipura to its south. It is the part of Anandapur Municipality.

Politics
The current MLA for Ghasipura Assembly Constituency is Sri Badrinarayan Patra of Biju Janata Dal, ex-education minister of the government of Odisha, who won the seat in the state elections of 2009. The previous MLA and ex-PCC president is Shri Niranjan Pattanaik of Indian National Congress.

Places of interest
There are several places of religious interest and tourism in the vicinity of Ghasipura town.

Jhadeshwar Temple
It is a very old temple of Lord Shiva located on the bank of Baitarani River. It is one of the 108 Shiva temples constructed on the bank of the river. Every year, in the month of March, a big festival known as Baruni Yatra is held here.

Satsang Vihar
This is a very beautiful temple of Sri Sri Thakur Anukulchandra. It is the principal centre of the Satsang movement in the whole Anandapur Subdivision.

Kushaleshwar Temple
The temple is located in the bank of river Kusei. It was built during the 9th century AD. This temple pays homage to Lord Kushaleswar. The temple was built in Panchamukhi style with five different deities facing towards different directions. Lord Shiva is facing towards East direction, Goddess Parvati towards North direction, Lord Kartikeya and Bhairava towards West direction and Lord Ganesha towards South direction. An important monument of this place is a stone embankment built on the side of the river Kusai, to protect the temple from corrosion. This monument is the second of its kind in the State. Major festival of this temple is Maha Shivaratri, in which thousands of devotees come to pay homage to the deity from across the state.

Bayababa Matha
This Hindu matha is located in the village Sailong, 2 km south of the town. It is a very famous religious place and picnic spot.

Sita Maa Tangara
This is believed as the Birthplace of Sita Mata. Hundreds of people visits the place on occasion of Raja and other Festivals . Located near village Narangapur on the top of a Single Rock height around and it is  12 km away from the Ghasipura Town.

Tukuna Sashan 
Tukuna Sashan is a Brahmin village of about 120 families. The sashan has a beautiful Shiv Temple named Kundeswar Mahadev, Managala and Narayan temple in the middle of the village. The village people are mainly dependent on agriculture. There is a Sanskrit Graduate College in the village, so many people of the village are CT/B Ed. and Sanskrit teachers.

Education
Literacy rate of Ghasipura is more than 80% which is more than the national and state avg.

Educational institutions located in Ghasipura are:-

Jhadeswar High School

Kushaleswar High School

Kannak Manjari Women's College

Kushaleswar Anchalika Mahavidyalaya

Tarimul High School

Janamangal high School, Keshadurapal

Pranaballav Public School, Ghasipura

Saraswati Shishu Mandir, Ghasipura

Transport

By road Ghasipura is well connected to district headquarters Keonjhar through NH 215, the busiest National Highway in the state and State Capital Bhubaneswar. As it falls on the path of Kendujhar-Bhubaneswar route.
Bhubaneswar is 155 km, Keonjhar is 80 km and Jajpur Road 35 km.

References

1. Times Of India, politics, Ghasipura, election results.
2. Educational Institutions in Ghasipura.

External links

Deogaon

Villages in Kendujhar district